Edward Jarvis (died ) was a Hudson's Bay Company chief factor.

In 1771 Jarvis started working for the company as a surgeon. He quickly learned the Cree language and was recruited to lead a surveying expedition.

In 1778 he became a chief factor. He retired in 1798 and died a few years later.

References

Year of birth unknown
1800s deaths
Hudson's Bay Company people
18th-century Canadian physicians
Canadian explorers